Alexander Bak (born January 16, 1991) is a Danish basketball player for Óbila CB of the Liga EBA. He has also competed for the Denmark national basketball team

In the 2018-19 season he played for Team FOG Næstved and averaged 5.0 points, 2.5 rebounds and 2.7 assists per game. Bak played for Oh!Tels ULB in the 2019-20 season and averaged 13.4 points, 5.0 rebounds and 3.1 assists per game. He signed with Óbila CB on September 24, 2020.

References

External links
  at basketball.realgm.com

1991 births
Living people
Danish men's basketball players
Danish expatriate basketball people in Spain
Small forwards
Hørsholm 79ers players